Air Greenland A/S (formerly named Grønlandsfly), also known as Greenlandair, is the flag carrier airline of Greenland, owned by the Greenlandic Government. It operates a fleet of 28 aircraft, including 2 airliners used for transatlantic and charter flights, 8 fixed-wing aircraft primarily serving the domestic network, and 18 helicopters feeding passengers from the smaller communities into the domestic airport network. Flights to heliports in the remote settlements are operated on contract with the government of Greenland.

Besides running scheduled services and government-contracted flights to most villages in the country, the airline also supports remote research stations, provides charter services for tourists and Greenland's energy and mineral-resource industries and permits medivac during emergencies. Air Greenland has seven subsidiaries, an airline, hotels, tour operators, and a travel agency specialised in Greenlandic tourism.

History
Founded in 1960 as Grønlandsfly, the airline started its first services with Catalina seaplanes and within the decade expanded to include DHC-3 Otters as well as Sikorsky S-61 helicopters. The majority of operations were based on helicopters until the newly established Greenland Home Rule began investing in a network of short takeoff and landing airfields. These were very expensive to construct and Greenland's airport fees are still among the highest in the world; they also required a new fleet: DHC-7 turboprops uniquely suited to the harsh terrain and weather conditions in Greenland. The reliability of connections improved as the domestic airport network expanded in the 1990s: increasing use of the Dash 7s made the airline less restricted by inclement weather. In the late 1990s and early 2000s, Air Greenland acquired a Boeing 757 and an Airbus A330, allowing it to open connections to Copenhagen, until then operated by SAS which also competed mid to late 2000s. In the 21st century, it competes with Icelandair for international connections and small charter services domestically.

1960s

The airline was established on 7 November 1960 as Grønlandsfly A/S, by the Scandinavian Airlines System (now SAS) and Kryolitselskabet Øresund, a Danish mining company involved with the cryolite operations at Ivittuut to provide transport and logistics for four American radar bases in Greenland. In 1962, interests in the firm were acquired by the Provincial Council (now the Greenland Home Rule Government) and the Royal Greenland Trade Department (now KNI).

The first flights serving the American bases in Greenland operated lightweight DHC-3 Otters and Sikorsky S-55 helicopters chartered from Canada. After a crash in 1961, Grønlandsfly used PBY Catalina water planes and DHC-6 Twin Otters on domestic routes. One of the Catalinas then crashed in 1962. In 1965, the Douglas DC-4 became the line's first larger airplane. It was followed by Sikorsky S-61 helicopters, which have remained in use: in 2010, they still served the communities of Kujalleq municipality in southern Greenland year-round and those of Disko Bay during the winter.

1970s

During the 1970s, Grønlandsfly upgraded its DC-4 to the newer DC-6, but principally focused on expanding its helicopter fleet, purchasing five more S-61s. By 1972, it opened up service to east Greenland with a helicopter based in Tasiilaq, and established Greenlandair Charter. Mining at Maamorilik in the Uummannaq Fjord required still more helicopters, and the airline purchased Bell 206s for the route. Grønlandsfly also picked up a Danish government contract to fly reconnaissance missions regarding the sea ice around Greenland.

By the end of 1979, the number of Grønlandsfly passengers served annually exceeded 60,000, more than the population of Greenland. That year, the airline's first international route was also opened, running between Greenland's capital Nuuk and the town of Iqaluit in northern Canada. The route connected Greenland's Kalaallit with Canada's Inuit and was operated in conjunction with the Canadian First Air line, but the planes were generally run empty and the route was shuttered 13 years later.

1980s

The establishment of the Greenland Home Rule Government in 1979 led to investment in a regional network of true airports, with short take-off and landing (STOL) airfields constructed in Nuuk, Ilulissat (1984), and Kulusuk. (These early airports were built without de-icing equipment, a situation which has proven problematic during Greenland's winters and continues to cause delays and losses for the airline.) The decade also saw the company train and hire its first native Kalaallit pilots.

To service the enlarged network, Grønlandsfly began acquiring DHC-7s, planes particularly suited to the often severe weather conditions in Greenland. The first was delivered on 29 September 1979, followed by more over the next decade. These planes remain in active service, serving every airport except Nerlerit Inaat near Ittoqqortoormiit, whose operation is handled by Icelandair under contract with Greenland Home Rule.

In 1981, Grønlandsfly opened its first route to Iceland, linking Reykjavík Airport to its main hub at Kangerlussuaq via Kulusuk. In 1986, a route to Keflavík allowed the company to break SAS's monopoly on flights between Greenland and Denmark via a Keflavík-Copenhagen leg operated by Icelandair. By 1989, the airline employed more than 400 Greenlanders and carried more than 100,000 passengers annually.

1990s

The company saw its activity curtailed as the mines at Ivittuut (1987) and Maamorilik (1990) closed operation, leading to a recession in the Greenlandic economy.

As the situation improved, the network of regional STOL airports was extended with Sisimiut Airport, Maniitsoq Airport and Aasiaat Airport built in mid-western Greenland and Qaarsut Airport and Upernavik Airport built in northwestern Greenland. (Uummannaq is served by Qaarsut Airport in conjunction with its heliport.)

Grønlandsfly also purchased its first jet aircraft, a Boeing 757-200 which began operation in May 1998. The airliner was named Kunuunnguaq in honour of the Greenlandic explorer and ethnologist Knud Rasmussen, whose bust decorates in the terminal of Kangerlussuaq hub. The airliner allowed the company to run the profitable Kangerlussuaq–Copenhagen route directly, without affiliates or a layover in Iceland. Thus, in 1999, the airline served 282,000 passengers, nearly triple the number at the end of the previous decade.

2000s
Around the turn of the millennium, the airline renewed its aging fleet, retiring several of its S-61 and 206 helicopters and replacing them with Bell 212s and Eurocopter AS350s. The company also sacked its CEO Peter Fich, who had proven unable to balance Greenland Home Rule's demands for local Greenlander service with the board's for expanded tourism, lower fares and higher profits. Under his replacement Finn Øelund, Grønlandsfly initially posted a DKK 30 million loss as contractual obligations maintained unprofitable service while a strike ruined the summer tourist season and Post Greenland moved a lucrative mail contract to the Danish-owned Air Alpha Greenland. In response, the company successfully pushed back against Greenland Home Rule's large demands, high fees and low subsidies and rebranded itself, anglicising its name to Air Greenland and adopting a new logo and livery on 18 April 2002.

In 2003, Finn Øelund left to head Maersk Air and was replaced as CEO by Flemming Knudson. Air Greenland opened a route from Copenhagen to Akureyri in Iceland; the service lasted for six years before finally being deemed unprofitable and ended. Also in 2003, SAS abandoned its Greenland service, leading Air Greenland to purchase its second airliner, an Airbus A330-200 named Norsaq. (SAS briefly revived the service during the peak season in 2007 before dropping it again in January 2009.) Owing to SAS's withdrawal from the market, Air Greenland received its contract with the U.S. Air Force for passenger service to and from Thule Air Base. Running from February 2004, the contract was renewed for another five-year period in 2008 despite SAS's brief return to the market.

The first takeover of another airline took place on 28 July 2006, when Air Greenland acquired Air Alpha Greenland, a subsidiary of Danish carrier Air Alpha. Air Alpha Greenland had operated helicopter flights in Disko Bay and in eastern Greenland. Since the takeover, the acquired Bell 222 helicopters have been used for passenger transfers between Nerlerit Inaat Airport and Ittoqqortoormiit Heliport.

In 2007, Flemming Knudson was moved to head the Royal Greenland fishing concern and current CEO Michael Binzer was hired with a mandate to lead the company towards greater commercialisation and self-sufficiency under the Qarsoq 2012 ("Arrow 2012") plan. On 13 June, SAS announced its intention to sell its stake in Air Greenland, a move later incorporated into its restructuring programme, but as of 2012 it has not found any buyers. On 1 October, the airline introduced its e-ticket system. Also in 2007, Air Greenland began direct service with Baltimore/Washington International Airport in the United States of America. After sixty American visitors were stranded by a strike of Air Greenland employees and the company refused to make alternate arrangements for their return, ticket sales slumped and the route was closed in March 2008.

In 2009, the airline carried 399,000 passengers.

2010s
In the 2010s, Air Greenland curtailed some services. On 1 January 2010, Air Greenland suspended its participation in SAS's EuroBonus frequent-flyer program due to technical difficulties. In 2011, nonstop service from Narsarsuaq to Copenhagen was suspended.

However, some expansion is planned. In order to compete with Icelandair, which operates service from Reykjavik Airport to Nuuk, Narsarsuaq, Ilulissat and the east coast of Greenland and now controls about 15% the market in Greenland-bound travel, Air Greenland may open a nonstop route between Nuuk and Keflavík International Airport in Iceland. Also, owing to improved technology and higher commodity prices, the Maarmorilik mines were due to reopen in November 2010 with zinc and iron ore reserves projected to last 50 years. As in the 1970s, the mine's supply flights to the mine will be operated by Air Greenland, using Bell helicopters (212s) based out of the Uummannaq Heliport.

Air Greenland's last remaining Twin Otter was sold in 2011 to Norlandair in exchange for cash and a one-fourth interest in the Icelandic company.

Reopening the connection to Iqaluit, now the capital of Nunavut, was considered by Air Greenland in late 2009, but finally happened in 2012. From 2012 to 2013, the airline saw a shy increase of 4 passengers flying to Nunavut over the previous year. However, this service ceased in 2015.

In July 2015, Air Greenland became a member of the European Regions Airline Association.

Prior to 2016, Air Greenland held a 50% stake in the Arctic Umiaq Line, an unprofitable but government-subsidised ferry service, with the other 50% controlled by Royal Arctic Line. In 2016 Air Greenland sold its stake in the company to Royal Arctic Line, and since July 1, 2016 the Arctic Umiaq Line has operated as a wholly owned subsidiary of Royal Arctic Line.

Destinations

Air Greenland's domestic airport network includes all 13 civilian airports within Greenland. Outside Greenland, the airline currently operates transatlantic flights to Keflavík International Airport in Iceland and Copenhagen Airport in Denmark.

Two international airports capable of serving large airliners – Kangerlussuaq Airport and Narsarsuaq Airport – were constructed as U.S. Air Force military bases during the Second World War and continue to be used for transatlantic flights. All other regional airports are STOL-capable and are served with Dash 7 and Dash 8 fixed-wing aircraft.

Smaller communities are served via heliports which connect with hubs located at Upernavik Airport in the Upernavik Archipelago in northwestern Greenland; at Uummannaq Heliport in the Uummannaq Fjord region in northwestern Greenland; at Ilulissat and Aasiaat Airports in the Disko Bay region in western Greenland; at Qaqortoq and Nanortalik Heliports in southern Greenland; and at Tasiilaq Heliport in southeastern Greenland. Of the 45 heliports in use, 8 are primary and equipped with a tarmac, a terminal building and permanent staff. The other heliports are helistops with either a gravel or grass landing area. Often helicopters need to make more than one flight for each connection to a fixed-wing flight because of passenger capacity, causing longer total travel time.

Air Greenland also performs charter flights within Europe on behalf of European travel agencies using its Airbus A330. In 2015, the decision voted by Greenland's governments to extend the runways of Nuuk and Ilulissat airports directly threatened the purpose of Air Greenland's single widebody aircraft. The A330 was only used from Pituffik and Kangerlussuaq to Copenhagen Kastrup, but in January 2017, Air Greenland had announced more commercial routes to be covered by the aircraft between Iceland and Greenland. In March 2017, Air Greenland also announced adding more flights to Kangerlussuaq.

Interline agreements
The agreement makes it again possible to combine a trip, in one ticket.

Air Greenland has interline agreements with the following airlines:
 DAT (Denmark)
 Finnair (International)
 Icelandair (International)
 Scandinavian Airlines (Scandinavia/Europe/International)

Settlement flights 
Air Greenland operates helicopter flights to most settlements in Greenland ("settlement flights") on contract with the government of Greenland, with the destination network subsidized and coordinated by the Ministry of Housing, Infrastructure and Transport. Settlement flights are not featured in the company's timetable, although they can be pre-booked.

Departure times for these flights as specified during booking are by definition approximate, with the settlement service optimised on the fly depending on local demand for a given day. Settlement flights in the Disko Bay region are unique in that they are operated only during winter and spring. During summer and autumn, transport between settlements is only by sea, with services operated by Diskoline, a government-contracted ferry service based in Ilulissat.

Fleet

As of December 2022, the Air Greenland fleet includes the following active aircraft:

Fixed-wing fleet

The De Havilland Canada DHC-8 is the airline's primary aircraft, operating on all domestic airport-to-airport routes. In 2010, the airline acquired its first Dash 8 aircraft.

The Air Greenland fixed-wing fleet consists of the following aircraft as of December 2022:

Helicopter fleet

The Bell 212 is the primary helicopter used for flights to district villages.

The Air Greenland helicopter fleet consists of the following aircraft:

Historical fleet
The older Sikorsky S-61N helicopters were stationed in Ilulissat Airport and Qaqortoq Heliport. With a capacity to seat 25 passengers, the S-61 based in southern Greenland was used to shuttle passengers arriving from Copenhagen at Narsarsuaq Airport. The sale of the Boeing 757 in April 2010 contributed to the long-term decline of the airport, with the airline planning to remove the old helicopter from the fleet.

In the past, Air Greenland (Grønlandsfly) also used the following aircraft:

 Aérospatiale Alouette III
 Airbus A330-200
 Bell 212
 Bell 204
 Bell 206B Jet Ranger
 Boeing 757-200
 Cessna 172
 Cessna 550
 de Havilland Canada DHC-6 Twin Otter
 de Havilland Canada Dash 7
 Douglas DC-3
 Douglas DC-4
 Douglas DC-6
 MD-500
 Consolidated PBY Catalina
 Piper PA-18 Super Cub
 Piper PA-31
 Sikorsky S-55
 Sikorsky S-58
 Sikorsky S-61

Management and structure

On 29 May 2019 the Greenlandic Government acquired 37.5% of the shares in Air Greenland from the SAS Group and 25% of the company shares from the Danish Government, becoming the sole owner of the airline. The total price of the 62.5% share was DKK 462 mill. The government ownership is held by the Ministry of Housing, Infrastructure, and Transport, that oversees the development of the transport industry in Greenland and controls Mittarfeqarfiit, the airport authority in Greenland.

The Air Greenland board of directors has a total of nine members, including three members representing airline employees. The current chairman is Mr Kjeld Zacho Jørgensen (appointed 2018) and the deputy-chairman is Ms Bodil Marie Damgaard (appointed 2016). The CEO of Air Greenland is Jakob Nitter Sørensen appointed in January 2017.

Headquartered in Nuuk, the airline had 668 employees in December 2009. The airline's technical base is located at Nuuk Airport.

Charter
The charter unit within Air Greenland is led by Hans Peter Hansen and employs 8 people, with 13 helicopters and 3 fixed-wing aircraft at its disposal. Excess capacity of airplanes is used for regular charters to tourist destinations in Europe, Asia, and Africa.

The helicopters, primarily the AS350, are used for special flights, such as search and rescue, air ambulance, charter flights to the Thule Air Base on contract with the U.S. Air Force, geological exploration, and supply flights to the mining sites and the research stations on the Greenland ice sheet. During the peak summer season, the helicopter crew is supplemented by freelance pilots from Norway and Sweden.

Other charter flights include heliskiing shuttles, services for the energy industry such as facilitating oil exploration or surveying for hydroelectric stations and environmental research counting polar bears and tracking other large Arctic fauna.

Subsidiary companies

Tourism 
 Hotel Arctic A/S, a hotel and travel agency based in Ilulissat, is a wholly owned subsidiary of Air Greenland.
 Greenland Travel A/S, a package-tour travel agency based in Copenhagen, is a wholly owned subsidiary of Air Greenland.
 World of Greenland A/S, an outfitter company based in Ilulissat, is a partnership between Greenland Travel A/S and Ilulissat Travel A/S.

Aviation
 Norlandair ehf. is an Icelandic airline. Air Greenland owns 25% of the Icelandic airline company.

Service

Business class
A flexible business class – named "Business-Class" – is offered by Air Greenland on transatlantic flights aboard Tuukkaq, its Airbus A330-800. The service includes a personal video screen, an in-seat power source, an amenity kit, blankets and a selection of newspapers. Passengers travelling in business class are eligible to use the Novia Business Class Lounge at Copenhagen Airport.

Economy class
Air Greenland offers flexible and restricted economy class on all flights operated with fixed-wing aircraft, with complimentary snacks and drinks. On transatlantic flights to Copenhagen, both economy class and business class seats are available, with in-flight meals served in all classes. Air Greenland publishes a quarterly Suluk (Kalaallisut: "Wing") in-flight magazine, with general information about current political and cultural events in Greenland and with news from the airline.

Accidents and incidents

 On 29 August 1961, a DHC-3 Otter (registration CF-MEX) crashed  from Kangerlussuaq. The aircraft was a non-scheduled service en route from Kangerlussuaq Airport to Aasiaat Airport when a fuel leak caused an in-flight fire. One of the pilots was killed, while the other pilot and the four passengers survived.
 On 12 May 1962, a PBY Catalina flying boat (registration CF-IHA) crashed during landing at Nuuk Airport. The accident was caused by a mechanical malfunction in the nose wheel doors preventing them from closing during landing on water, resulting in the aircraft sinking. The accident killed 15 of the 21 people on board.
It was en route to Paamiut from Nuuk. The same helicopter had had an emergency landing on the Kangerlussuaq fjord 2 years earlier, due to a double flameout on both engines because of ice in its intake.
 On 7 June 2008, a Eurocopter AS350 crashed on the runway at Nuuk Airport. There were no injuries, but the helicopter was damaged beyond repair.
 On 29 January 2014, Air Greenland Flight 3205, an Air Greenland Dash 8-Q202 (registration OY-GRI), was involved in a runway excursion accident at Ilulissat Airport (BGJN), Greenland. Flight GL3205 originated in Kangerlussuaq Airport (BGSF), Greenland. Four passengers were taken to the hospital for observation, there were no fatalities or serious injuries. The aircraft went off the left side of the runway and down a  dropoff and came to rest on rocky terrain approximately abeam the runway 25 threshold. The aircraft was not repaired.

See also

SAS Group
Scandinavian Airlines
Transport in Greenland
List of airports in Greenland
List of the largest airports in the Nordic countries
List of companies of Greenland
Economy of Greenland

References

External links

 
 Air Greenland information, AirportGuide.com
 Air Greenland review, YouTube.com

Airlines of Greenland
European Regions Airline Association
Companies based in Nuuk
Danish companies established in 1960
Airlines established in 1960
Danish brands
Greenlandic brands
Helicopter airlines
SAS Group
SAS Group members